The 2016 United States House of Representatives election in the United States Virgin Islands was on Tuesday, November 8, 2016, to elect the non-voting Delegate to the United States House of Representatives from the United States Virgin Islands' at-large congressional district.

The non-voting delegate is elected for a two-year term. The incumbent, Stacey Plaskett, ran for re-election, and won a second term.

Primary elections were held on August 6, 2016.

Democratic primary

Candidates

Declared
 Stacey Plaskett, incumbent Delegate
 Ronald E. Russell, former Virgin Islands Senator

Results

Republican primary

Candidates

Withdrew
 Gordon Ackley, Air Force veteran and owner of Ackley Media Group (Ran as a write in candidate)

General election

References

External links

United States Virgin Islands
2016
United States House of Representatives